Certified Guaranty Company, also known as CGC, is a Sarasota, Florida comic book grading service. CGC is an independent member of the Certified Collectibles Group of companies. It is the first independent and impartial third party grading service for comic books.

The company was launched in early 2000 and has since gone on to become a notable part of the comic book collecting community.  they have graded over 7 million comic books.

Process 
Comic books are sent to CGC for grading and encapsulation either directly by the owner through CGC's website or through an authorized dealer. People sending in comics themselves can get a 10% discount from CGC by using the "Internet Partners" links on their submission page. Comics may also be submitted to the company from an individual who signs up for one of their three paid membership options. The company also accepts submissions in person by sending representatives to several comic book conventions. Upon receipt, the comics are inspected by one pre-grader for obvious defects (missing pages, etc.) and are then graded by three graders in a temperature- and humidity-controlled environment. The grades are not averaged together, as The Head Grader determines the final grade. This means that if two graders rate a book at 7.0, for example, and the Head Grader grades it a 7.5, the latter grade prevails. The graders look for damage and signs of restoration. The comic books are then graded on a scale from 0.5 to 10. These numbers correspond with more traditional descriptive grades such as "very fine", "near mint", and "mint", with the higher numbers indicating a better grade.

In addition to the numeric grade, CGC also uses color-coded labels to categorize comics:

After grading, the comics are placed in an inner well, a sealed sleeve of Barex, a highly gas-impermeable plastic polymer. Then, the comics are sonically sealed in a hard plastic, tamper-evident holder. This process is often referred to in comics jargon as "slabbing". A label is affixed at the top indicating the title, date, grade, page quality, and any notes, such as notable creators. Books which would be damaged by encapsulation are returned without this process.

Purpose of grading services
Prior to advent of CGC grading and authentication services, collectors, buyers, and sellers were at the mercy of the marketplace. There was a clear possibility of a conflict of interest as a seller would benefit from exaggeration of the condition to inflate the value and thus increase profits. Likewise a buyer could dispute the condition of a book with the intention of purchasing at a lower price. CGC's primary service is to provide a reliable, consistent, and non-partial comic books grading and authentication, which can greatly mitigate all these challenges and pitfalls that are inherent with comic book collecting.

Grading
Condition is a significant factor in the valuation of a comic book. An example is Action Comics #1, the first published appearance of Superman. In 2010, two copies sold on the comic book auction website comicconnect.com for record prices. One copy was CGC graded 8.0 and sold for US$1 million. The second book at a later auction, a copy CGC graded at 8.5 sold for a record-setting $1.5 million, the most ever paid up to that time for a comic book. A 9.0-rated version sold at a 2014 auction for $3.2 million. This underscores CGC's ability to provide a grading service as a neutral third party from a transaction, this created a degree of impartiality that did not exist before. This has shown that there is a demand for graded books as consistently these books have set sales records.

Signatures
CGCs gold label Signature Series is a signature validation service in which a CGC representative witnesses a comic being signed by a specific individual as requested by the comic book's owner. Furthermore, the CGC establishes a chain of custody of that specific comic until it is “slabbed” and subsequently returned to the individual who ordered the signature series grading and verification. This mitigates signature forgery concerns.

Identifying restoration and counterfeits

For highly valued comics, a higher grade can result in a price difference of thousands of dollars. Similarly, a comic book marked by CGC with the purple "Restored" label can suffer a significant price reduction. A part of CGC's service is to identify the authenticity of a comic, as counterfeiting is a problem. One of the first steps CGC takes upon receipt of a book is the determination, made by a pre-grader, as to whether a book has been restored. Generally, an original book will be of more value than a restored book. CGC labels a comic book it has identified as restored with a purple label. Another grade that CGC implemented in 2008 is the "NG" or no-grade label, which identifies a comic missing cover or an authentic piece/page of a comic that has been authenticated. Authentication is part of the grading process to determine if a submitted book is genuine and not counterfeit.

References

Further reading 

Comic book collecting
Companies established in 2000
2000 establishments in New Jersey
Privately held companies based in Florida